The Supremes were an American singing group from Detroit, Michigan, who recorded for Motown Records as their premier act. The original lineup included Diana Ross, Mary Wilson and Florence Ballard. This is a chronology overview of the Supremes history.
 

Legend

1930s

|}

1940s

|}

1950s

|}

1960

|}

1961

|}

1962

|}

1963

|}

1964

|}

1965

|}

1966

 

|}

1967

 

|}

1968

|}

1969

|}

1970s

|}

1980s

|}

1990s

|}

2000s

|}

2010s

|}

2020s

|}

See also
 The Supremes discography

References

The Supremes
Timelines of music